Changzhi Township, also spelled Changjhih Township is a rural township in Pingtung County, Taiwan.

History
On November 26, 1895, Japanese forces massacred villages in the area.

Geography
Area: 
Population: 29,083 (February 2023)

Administrative divisions

The township comprises 16 villages: Decheng, Dehe, Derong, Dexie, Fuxing, Jinxing, Lunshang, Fanchang, Fanhua, Fanlong, Fanrong, Ronghua, Tantou, Xiangyang, Xintang and Changxing.

References

External links

 Changzhi Township Office 
 

Townships in Pingtung County